Earl Timothy Cone (born December 14, 1957) is an American professional basketball coach who is the head coach of Barangay Ginebra San Miguel in the Philippine Basketball Association (PBA). He is the most accomplished coach in PBA history with twenty-five (25) titles including two (2) Grand Slams, four (4) Coach of the Year awards, and the winningest coach of the league tallying more than a thousand (1,000) games won. 

Cone is a proponent of the triangle offense.

Early life and education
Cone was born in the United States and grew up in Oregon. He moved to the Philippines when he was nine years old after his father came to the country to work in the logging industry. Cone studied in a public elementary school in Baler, Aurora and later moved to the International School Manila.

Cone returned to the United States when he was 18 years old to study at the Menlo College in California and the George Washington University in Washington D.C. After graduating from college, Cone worked in a bank in San Francisco before returning to the Philippines at age 24.

Coaching career

Club

Alaska Milk (1989–2011)
In 1989, Cone took over as the coach of the Alaska Air Force with players such as the famed Bruise Brothers duo of Yoyoy Villamin and Ricky Relosa, and Abet Guidaben. A year later, Cone led the Air Force to the finals of the 1990 PBA Third Conference. Alaska blew a 2–0 lead in the best-of-five series to suffer one of the biggest collapses in PBA history, losing to Purefoods in five games.

Cone was barred from coaching in the 1991 PBA All-Filipino Conference due to a February 1990 case filed by the Basketball Coaches Association of the Philippines questioning the alien employment permit given to Cone by the Department of Labor and Employment. The group's complaints stemmed from Article 40 of the Labor Code that only allows the hiring of a foreigner only after determining that no Philippine resident is competent, able, and willing to perform services at the time of application. The Supreme Court of the Philippines ruled against General Milling Corporation, Cone's corporate employer, in April 1991. Cone was able to return to PBA coaching when he gained permanent resident status after his August 1991 marriage to Filipina girlfriend Cristina Viaplana.

Cone and Alaska won their first championship by defeating Ginebra San Miguel in the 1991 Third Conference. That team was led by Jojo Lastimosa, Eugene Quilban and Bong Alvarez.

After several struggles, Cone's team would have a strong group of locals Lastimosa, Johnny Abarrientos, Bong Hawkins, Jeffrey Cariaso and Poch Juinio, while having import Sean Chambers for the Milkmen. From 1994 to 1998, the Milkmen won eight titles in 14 conferences during the stretch. The highlight of that run, though, would come in the 1996 season when Alaska won the coveted PBA Grand Slam, becoming the third franchise and the fourth team to win a Grand Slam in the history of the league.

While Alaska continued to dominate by adding Kenneth Duremdes in 1997. Duremdes, playing a limited role with the Pop Cola franchise, rose up to the occasion in 1998 under Cone's tutelage, winning the PBA Most Valuable Player Award at 24 years of age. That year, Cone was hired as the coach of the Philippine Centennial Team led by Duremdes, Abarrientos, Lastimosa, three players on Cone's Alaska team, and PBA stars Alvin Patrimonio, Marlou Aquino, Vergel Meneses and Allan Caidic. That team won a bronze medal in the 1998 Asian Games in Bangkok, Thailand.

Alaska won the 2000 All-Filipino Cup, but afterwards, the team faced rebuilding and traded away several remnants of the old Alaska. Cone, however, would lead the young team of John Arigo and Ali Peek to runner-up finishes in the 2002 Governors' and All-Filipino Cup. A year later, the Aces added UAAP star Mike Cortez and Brandon Cablay, leading Alaska to the 2003 PBA Invitational Cup championship, Cone's 11th title.

On July 17, 2006, Manila Standard reported that after his 17 years of service Alaska is set to terminate Cone depending on a meeting between both parties after Cone's contract with the Aces expired on July 15. Rumors also speculated that his replacement will be his former assistant, former National team mentor Chot Reyes, with Cone staying on as team consultant.

However, a day later, the Aces' official website reported that Cone has agreed to a new deal to stay on as the team's head coach for the 2006–07 PBA season. Terms of the contract were not disclosed.

Purefoods (2011–2015)
On September 1, 2011, Alaska team owner Wilfred Uytengsu announced that it has "released Tim Cone as head coach of the Alaska Aces" after his 22 years of service for the Alaska Aces. Uytengsu remarked that Cone requested to be released a week earlier. Cone was quick to deny in a press conference that he is set to coach B-Meg Llamados, another PBA team.

On September 14, 2011, Tim Cone was at the B-Meg Llamados practice that day and was introduced as the new head coach. He tapped former Alaska players Johnny Abarrientos and Jeffrey Cariaso as assistant coaches. The two new assistant coaches were joined by current assistant coach Koy Banal.

On May 6, 2012, the Llamados won the 2012 PBA Commissioner's Cup championship 4–3 over defending champion Talk 'N Text Tropang Texters. This was Cone's 14th title, and his first with B-Meg.

On October 25, 2013, the Llamados, under Cone's tutelage, won the PBA Governors Cup championship, after beating Petron Blaze Boosters. By winning the season-ending best-of-seven series 4–3, the former Purefoods ballclub won its second championship over the last five conferences and more importantly the 15th career title for Cone, putting the veteran coach in the company of the great Baby Dalupan at the top of the all-time list.

On February 26, 2014, Cone won his 16th PBA title as he guided the Mixers to their 11th title against the Rain or Shine Elasto Painters. They beat the E-Painters in six games. With this win, he broke legendary Baby Dalupan's record. On May 15, 2014, San Mig Coffee Mixers beat the Talk N' Text Tropang Texters in Game 4 of best-of-five series, where San Mig earned the chance to capture the rare Grand Slam. This championship gave Tim Cone his 17th PBA title. He clinched his 18th title, and again made history by being the first mentor to win two Grand Slams after he steered San Mig Coffee to become Grand Slam Champions while accomplishing four straight championships and grabbing the 2014 Governor's Cup title.

Barangay Ginebra San Miguel (2015-present)

On July 20, 2015, San Miguel Corporation president Ramon Ang confirmed the appointment of Cone as the new head coach of Barangay Ginebra San Miguel. The reassignment of Cone will seek to end the curse of Ginebra which last won in the 2008 Fiesta Conference.

On October 4, 2016, Cone led Brgy. Ginebra to its first Finals appearance since 2013. Ginebra defeated sister team San Miguel Beermen in a do or die Game 5, 117–92. Ginebra went on to face the Meralco Bolts in the Finals and winning in six games (4–2), giving the team its first championship after 8 years of drought. Cone later led Ginebra to six more championships.

On November 18, 2022, he recorded his 1000th win, the most wins for a PBA coach.

National team
Tim Cone has led the Philippine men's national basketball team as its head coach. He guided the Philippine Centennial Team to a bronze medal at the 1998 Asian Games. Prior to that, the national team under Cone's watch had a training camp in the U.S. and won the 1998 William Jones Cup. In September 2019, he was appointed head coach of the national team again for at least the 2019 Southeast Asian Games following the resignation of Yeng Guiao following the Philippines poor performance in the 2019 FIBA Basketball World Cup.

Personal life
Tim Cone is married to Cristina Viaplana, a Filipino, since August 1991 after dating for seven years. Cone's daughter works in the United States as of 2019. He can also speak Filipino although he prefers to speak in English in press conferences.

List of PBA championships
25× PBA champion, 37× Finals appearances

in Alaska Franchise (13):
 1991 Third Conference
 1994 Governors'
 1995 Governors'
 1996 All-Filipino
 1996 Commissioner's
 1996 Governors'
 1997 Governors'
 1998 All-Filipino
 1998 Commissioner's
 2000 All-Filipino
 2003 Invitational
 2007 Fiesta
 2010 Fiesta
in Purefoods Franchise (5):
 2012 Commissioner's
 2013 Governors'
 2013–14 Philippine
 2014 Commissioner's
 2014 Governors'
in Barangay Ginebra San Miguel (7):
 2016 Governors'
 2017 Governors'
 2018 PBA Commissioner's
 2019 Governors'
 2020 Philippine
 2021 Governors'
 2022–23 Commissioner's

PBA Head Coaching record

|-
| align="left" |Alaska Aces
| align="left" |2009–10
|62||39||23||.629 || align="center"| Lost 2010 Philippine Cup Finals  Won 2010 Fiesta Conference Finals
|-
| align="left" |Alaska Aces
| align="left" |2010–11
|42||22||20||.524 || align="center"| Lost 2011 Philippine Cup Quarterfinals Round   Lost 2011 Commissioner's Cup Quarterfinals Round  Lost 2011 Governors' Cup Semifinals round
|-
| align="left" |B-Meg Llamados
| align="left" |2011–12
|62||38||24||.613 || align="center"| Lost 2012 Philippine Cup Quarterfinals Round   Won 2012 Commissioner's Cup Finals  Lost 2012 PBA Governors' Cup Finals
|-
| align="left" |San Mig Super Coffee Mixers
| align="left" |2012–13
|64||38||26||.594 || align="center"| Lost 2013 Philippine Cup Semifinals Round   Lost 2013 Commissioner's Cup Semifinals Round  Won 2013 Governors' Cup Finals
|-
| align="left" |San Mig Super Coffee Mixers
| align="left" |2013–14
|71||41||30||.577 || align="center"| Won 2014 Philippine Cup Finals   Won 2014 Commissioner's Cup Finals  Won 2014 Governors' Cup Finals
|-
| align="left" |Star Hotshots
| align="left" |2014–15
|45||24||21||.533 || align="center"| Lost 2015 Philippine Cup Quarterfinals round   Lost 2015 Commissioner's Cup Semifinals round  Lost 2015 Governors' Cup Semifinals round
|-
| align="left" |Barangay Ginebra
| align="left" |2015–16
|49||31||18||.633 || align="center"| Lost 2016 Philippine Cup Quarterfinals round   Lost 2016 Commissioner's Cup Quarterfinals round  Won 2016 Governors' Cup Finals
|-
| align="left" |Barangay Ginebra
| align="left" |2016–17
|64||40||24||.625 || align="center"| Lost 2017 Philippine Cup Finals   Lost 2017 Commissioner's Cup Semifinals round  Won 2017 Governors' Cup Finals
|-
| align="left" |Barangay Ginebra
| align="left" |2017–18
|57||35||22||.614 || align="center"| Lost in 2018 Philippine Cup Semifinals round  Won 2018 Commissioner's Cup Finals  Lost in 2018 Governor's Cup Semifinals round
|-
| align="left" |Barangay Ginebra
| align="left" |2018–19
|52||33||19||.635 || align="center"| Lost in 2019 Philippine Cup Quarterfinals round  Lost in 2019 Commissioner's Cup Semifinals round  Won 2019 Governors' Cup Finals
|-
| align="left" |Barangay Ginebra
| align="left" |2020
|22||16||6||.727 || align="center"| Won 2020 Philippine Cup Finals
|-class="sortbottom"
| align="center" colspan=2|Career||590|||357|||233||.6051||

References

1957 births
Living people
American expatriate basketball people in the Philippines
American men's basketball players
Basketball coaches from Oregon
Basketball players from Oregon
George Washington University alumni
Menlo Oaks men's basketball players
Alaska Aces (PBA) coaches
Philippine Basketball Association broadcasters
Philippines men's national basketball team coaches
People from Aurora (province)
Magnolia Hotshots coaches
Barangay Ginebra San Miguel coaches